The proleptic Gregorian calendar is produced by extending the Gregorian calendar backward to the dates preceding its official introduction in 1582. In nations that adopted the Gregorian calendar after its official and first introduction, dates occurring in the interim period of 15 October 1582 (the first date of use of Gregorian calendrical dates, being dated 5 October 1582 in the preceding Julian calendar) to the date on which the pertinent nation adopted the Gregorian calendar and abandoned the Julian calendar are sometimes 'Gregorianized' also. For example, the birthday of U.S. President George Washington was originally dated 11 February 1731 (Old Style) because Great Britain, of which he was born a subject, used (until September 1752) the Julian calendar and dated the beginning of English years as 25 March. After Great Britain switched to the Gregorian calendar, Washington's birthday was dated 22 February 1732 proleptically, according to the Gregorian calendar applied backward. This remains the modern dating of his birthday.

Usage
ISO 8601:2004 (clause 3.2.1 The Gregorian calendar) explicitly requires use of the proleptic Gregorian calendar for all dates before the introduction of 15 October 1582, if the partners to an exchange of information agree. Most scholars of Maya civilization also use it, especially when converting Long Count dates (1st century BC – 10th century AD).

The best practice for citation of historically contemporary documents is to cite the date as expressed in the original text and to notate any contextual implications and conclusions regarding the calendar used and equivalents in other calendars. This practice permits others to re-evaluate the original evidence.

For these calendars one can distinguish two systems of numbering years BC. Bede and later historians did not enumerate any year as zero (nulla in Latin; see Year zero); therefore the year preceding AD 1 is 1 BC. In this system the year 1 BC is a leap year (likewise in the proleptic Julian calendar). Mathematically, it is more convenient to include a year 0 and represent earlier years as negative numbers for the specific purpose of facilitating the calculation of the number of years between a negative (BC) year and a positive (AD) year. This is the convention in astronomical year numbering and the international standard date system, ISO 8601. In these systems, the year 0 is a leap year.

Although the nominal Julian calendar began in 45 BC, leap years between 45 BC and 1 BC were irregular (see Leap year error). Thus the Julian calendar with quadrennial leap years was only used from the end of AD 4 until 1582 or later (contingent on the specific nation in question).

The proleptic Gregorian calendar is sometimes used in computer software to simplify identifying pre-Gregorian dates, e. g. in PostgreSQL, MySQL, SQLite, PHP, CIM, Delphi and Python.

Difference between Julian and proleptic Gregorian calendar dates
Before the official and first introduction of the Gregorian calendar, the differences between Julian and proleptic Gregorian calendar dates are as follows:

The table below assumes a Julian leap day of 29 February, but the Julian leap day, that is, the bissextile day ( in Latin) was accomplished by repeating 24 February (see Julian reform). Therefore, the dates between 24 and 29 February in all leap years were irregular.

Note: When converting a date in a year which is leap in the Julian calendar but not in the Gregorian, include 29 February in the calculation when the conversion crosses the border of February and March.

See also
 Julian calendar
 Proleptic Julian calendar

References

Gregorian calendar
Specific calendars